Pollock roe, also pollack roe (also known as myeongnan and tarako) is the roe of Alaska pollock (Gadus chalcogrammus) which, despite its name, is a species of cod. Salted pollock roe is a popular culinary ingredient in Korean, Japanese, and Russian cuisines.

Names 
In Korean, pollock roe is called myeongnan, while the salted roe dish is called myeongnan-jeot, being considered a type of jeotgal (salted seafood). The Korean word myeongnan means pollock roe as myeong came from myeongtae, the Korean word for Alaska pollock, and ran, also pronounced nan, means "egg (roe)". As jeot is a category of salted seafood, the compound myeongnan-jeot refers to salted pollock roe.

The Japanese word for pollock roe is tarako. Pollock food products are often called karashi-mentaiko or mentaiko, a compound of mentai, borrowed from its Korean cognate myeongtae meaning Alaska pollock, and ko, a Japanese word for "child (roe)". Alaska pollock are called suketōdara in Japanese.  means cod in Japanese. Tarako literally means "cod roe", but generally refers to smaller salted roe sacs.

In Russian, pollock roe is called ikra mintaya. The word is also used to referred to the salted roe. The word is also derived from its Korean cognate, myeongtae.

History

Korea
Koreans have been enjoying pollock roe since the Joseon era (1392–1897). One of the earliest mentions are from Diary of the Royal Secretariat, where a 1652 entry stated: "The management administration should be strictly interrogated for bringing in pollock roe instead of cod roe." Recipe for salted pollock roe is found in a 19th-century cookbook, Siuijeonseo.

Japan 
A 1696 Japanese book records the use of Alaska pollock's roe in Northern land.

The dish mentaiko originates from Korea and is originally the Korean myeongnan-jeot. , who was born in the city of Busan, Korea during the Japanese occupation, founded the oldest mentaiko company in Japan called "Aji no Mentaiko Fukuya" (:ja:ふくや) after World War II. He made slight modifications to myeongnan-jeot to adapt to Japanese tastes and introduced it to Japan as "Karashi mentaiko" (:ja:辛子明太子), its popular name is "mentaiko". The milder, less spicy version is called tarako in Japan.

Salted pollock roe

Korea 

Traditionally, myeongnan-jeot was made before dongji (winter solstice). Intact skeins of Alaska pollock roe are washed carefully with salt water, then salted in a sokuri (bamboo basket). The ratio of salt to roe ranges from less than 5:100 to more than 15:100. After 2–3 days, salted and drained roe is marinated for at least a day with fine gochutgaru (chilli powder) and finely minced garlic. myeongnan-jeot is usually served with sesame seeds or some drops of sesame oil.

Myeongnan-jeot, whether raw, dried, and/or cooked, is a common banchan (side dish) and anju (food served with alcoholic beverages). It is also used in a variety of dishes, such as gyeran-jjim (steamed egg), bokkeum-bap (fried rice), and recently in Korean-style Italian pasta dishes.

Myeongnan-jeot is a specialty of South Hamgyong Province of North Korea, and Gangwon Province and Busan of South Korea.

Japan
Mentaiko, adapted from Korean myeongnan-jeot, hence the name mentai (derived from the Korean myeongtae, 명태, 明太, meaning pollack) + ko (Korean 알, 子, meaning baby/roe), is common in Japan. It is made in a variety of flavors and colors and is available at airports and main train stations. It is usually eaten with onigiri, but is also enjoyed by itself with sake. It is a product of the Hakata ward of Fukuoka City. Milder version is called tarako,

Recently in Japan, mentaiko pasta has become common.  Mentaiko is mixed with butter or mayonnaise and used as a sauce for spaghetti.  Thin strips of Nori (海苔) and Shiso leaves are often sprinkled on top.

Mentaiko was nominated as Japan's number one side dish in the Japanese weekly magazine, Shūkan Bunshun.

Tarako is served in a number of ways: plain (usually for breakfast), as a filling for onigiri, and as a pasta sauce (usually with nori). Traditionally, tarako was dyed bright red, but recent concerns about the safety of food coloring have all but eliminated that custom. In Kyūshū, tarako is commonly served with red chili pepper flakes.

Russia 
In Russia, pollock roe is consumed as a sandwich spread. The product, resembling liquid paste due to the small size of eggs and oil added, is sold canned.

See also 

 Alaska pollock as food
 Jeotgal
 Masago
 Tobiko

References

External links 
 

Japanese seafood
Jeotgal
Korean cuisine
Roe
Korean seafood
Russian cuisine